Wichayanee Pearklin (Thai: วิชญาณี เปียกลิ่น), also known as Gam Wichayanee, Gam The Star, or simply Gam (born September 21, 1989), is a Thai singer, actress, and television host. Gam is the "Most Admired Female Singer in Modern Thai Music", according to Suan Dusit Poll in 2018, surveying Thai people around Thailand. She is also regarded by the Thai media as the "Female Artist with Outstanding Powerful Voice" or the "Powerful Diva" and has been awarded various accolades, including the National Outstanding Youth Award and Most Popular Female Artist Award. Gam was firstly known to the Thai public as the first female winner who won popular votes from Thai people in "The Star" Season 4 (2008), the first singing talent reality show in Thailand. She is widely known as a singer who voices a Thai version of Queen Elsa in a Disney's animation film Frozen and sings "Let It Go." Also in Frozen II ("Into the Unknown").

Gam is recognized for her power, singing technique, and emotional performance. She is able to sing in many genres, from pop, R&B, jazz to Thai country, and in many languages, including Thai, English, and Korean.

Early life 

Gam was born in 1989 in Phatthalung, Thailand then moved to Phuket in 1995 to live with her younger sister Jinnapak Pearklin and her mother Yada Pearklin, who worked as a nurse. Gam was able to sing when she was three years old. During the first year at her primary school, she won a singing competition for the first time, and when she was in her third year, she was selected to be a lead singer of the school's music band and practiced singing difficult Thai country songs to improve her singing skills. Her mother brought Gam to participate in numerous contests in various events, where Gam usually won the first prizes.

Gam furthered her high school education at Satree Phuket School and joined “The Star” Season 4 in 2008. She won the talent show and signed a contract with the label Exact, under GMM Grammy, the largest media conglomerate entertainment company in Thailand. Then she began her singing career in Thai modern music. After winning The Star, she passed a direct examination to further her bachelor's degree at the Faculty of Music, Silpakorn University and graduated in 2013. Gam presently lives with her sister in Bangkok while her mother is still working in Phuket.

Entertainment career 

Gam released her first single "Kwam Pook Pan Sue Kwam Rak Mai Dai (Relationship Can't Buy Love)" in May 2008 and her first album GAM in October 2008. She first sang an original soundtrack named "Sang Lae Ngao (Light and Shadow)" for a TV drama and received a Diamond Song Award from the Ministry of Culture. In 2009, she debuted her musical play as a supporting actress in Jukebox Musical. Gam was cast by Disney to voice Tiana in the Thai version of the animation The Princess and the Frog.

Gam released her second album Baby It's You in 2011. In 2012 she acted in Rak/Jap/Jai The Romantic Musical where her song "Kong Tai Tee Yak Hai Jai" gained a second Diamond Song Award from the Ministry of Culture. In 2013, she joined various significant projects, including voicing the Thai version of Queen Elsa in Disney's animation film Frozen, and was selected by the Royal Thai Government to perform at the Official Ceremony Commemorating King Bhumibol Adulyadej at the Royal Thai Government House.

In 2015, Gam was a television host for the first time for a variety show See Podum (Four Spades) ,and has been a judge and commentator in many singing talent TV programs. She was also a contestant in the Mask Singer (Thailand) Season 3 in 2017.

On February 9, 2020, Gam was called to join Idina Menzel, Aurora and eight more of Elsa's international dubbers to perform the song “Into the Unknown” during the 92nd Academy Awards. Every international performer sang one line of the song in a different language: Maria Lucia Heiberg Rosenberg in Danish, Willemijn Verkaik in German, Takako Matsu in Japanese, Carmen Sarahí in Latin American Spanish, Lisa Stokke in Norwegian, Kasia Łaska in Polish, Anna Buturlina in Russian, Gisela in European Spanish and Gam in Thai.

Music

Solo album

Single

Ost. 
 2008  (แสงและเงา) -  (เงาอโศก)
 2008  (มีแค่หัวใจ) -  (สกุลกา)
 2008  (แล้วฉันจะรักเธอได้อย่างไร) -  (สกุลกา)
 2010  (นอกสายตา (Ver. ลูกทุ่ง)) -  (หัวใจพลอยโจร)
 2010  (โทรหาครั้งสุดท้าย) -  (หัวใจพลอยโจร)
 2010  (นักร้องบ้านนอก) -  (หัวใจพลอยโจร)
 2010  (แค่คำคำเดียว) -  (มาลัยสามชาย)
 2011  (ไม่เหลืออะไรเลย) -  (ตลาดอารมณ์)
 2011  (เพิ่งรู้ตัวเอง) -  (เงาพราย)
 2013  (กามเทพ) -  (มารกามเทพ)
 2013  (อีสา) -  (อีสา)
 2014  (ที่หนึ่งในหัวใจเธอ) -  (สงครามนางงาม)
 2016  (ขอบฟ้าไม่มีจริง) -  (ลายหงส์)
 2017  (ไม่มีใครยอมใคร) (Together With Ravisrarat Pibulpanuvat) -  (ชิงรัก ริษยา)
 2017  (ใกล้แค่ลมหายใจ) -  (ตะวันยอแสง)
 2017  (น้ำตาหยดสุดท้าย) -  (ล่า)
 2017  (ทางเดินแห่งรัก) -  (นางสาวไม่จำกัดนามสกุล)
 2019  (ถ้าเลือกได้) - Krong Kam (กรงกรรม)
 2019  (ปรุง) -  (อรุณา 2019)
 2019 Bai Mai (ใบไม้) - Bai Mai Tee Plid Plew (ใบไม้ที่ปลิดปลิว)
 2019  (รักไปทำไม) - Song Kram Nak Pun 2 (สงครามนักปั้น 2)
 2020  (ปลอม (FAKE)) -  (เนื้อใน)
 2021  (ได้ยินไหมคำว่ารัก) -  (ทางเสือผ่าน)
 2021  (บทเรียนของความเชื่อใจ) - Wake Up Ladies: Very Complicated (Wake Up ชะนี Very Complicated)
 2021  (มากไปใช่ไหม) -  (สองเสน่หา)
 2021  (ขอยอม) - Game of Outlaws (เกมล่าทรชน)
 2021 We're alright - (กะรัตรัก)
 2022  (ไม่อยากให้เธอจากไปไหน) - Wela Kammathep (เวลากามเทพ)
 2022  (แค่กอด) - My Queen (รักสุดท้ายยัยจอมเหวี่ยง)
 2022  (ฉันยังคิดถึง) - Poot Mae Nam Khong (ภูตแม่น้ำโขง)

Performance

Television 
 2008  (ความลับของ Superstar) (/Channel 5) as Gam Wichayanee (cameo)
 2010  (หัวใจพลอยโจร) (/Channel 5) as Khan Jai
 2014  (น่ารัก) (/Channel 5) as Chee Phong
 2014 Songkram Nang Ngarm (สงครามนางงาม) (/One 31) as Gam Wichayanee (cameo)
 2015 Ngao Jai (เงาใจ) (/One 31) as Tibby
 2019 Song Kram Nak Pun Season 2 (สงครามนักปั้น Season 2) (/One 31) as Gam Wichayanee (cameo)

Series 
 2013 Club Friday The Series 2 ตอน คนดีที่เธอไม่รัก (/Green Channel) as Aum
 2015 Wifi Society Ep. Keep in Touch รักครั้งใหม่ ไม่ปล่อยหลุดมือ (/One 31) as Kobuw
 2016 I Was Born In the Reign of Rama IX The Series (/One 31) as Tay
 2017 Fabulous 30: The Series (/One 31) as Yui
 2018 Blacklist (/GMM 25) as Ms. Jinmanee
 2022 My Sassy Princess (/One 31) as Rainbow

Sitcom 
 2015 ฮา in One ตอน นางซิน (/One 31) as Ketee

Theater 
 20

Film
 2012 Rak/Jap/Jai The Romantic Musical as Wun

Television programs

MC 
 2015 4 Po Dam (2015-2018)
 2015 YouTube:GamWichayaneeThailand

Director 
 2017 Stage Fighter (2016-2017)
 2017 Hakoo Duet 
 2017 Diva Makeover เสียงเปลี่ยนสวย
 2019 Top One ตัวจริงชิงหนึ่ง

Contestant 
 2008 The Star Season 4
 2017 The Mask Singer (Thai season 3)
 2018 Re-Master Thailand 
 2017 Rong La Neo

References 

1989 births
Living people
Wichayanee Pearklin
Wichayanee Pearklin
Wichayanee Pearklin
Wichayanee Pearklin
Wichayanee Pearklin
Wichayanee Pearklin
Wichayanee Pearklin
Wichayanee Pearklin
Wichayanee Pearklin
Wichayanee Pearklin
Wichayanee Pearklin